Rosslyn is an industrial suburb of Akasia, 29 km north-west of Pretoria and part of the City of Tshwane Municipality in the Gauteng province of South Africa. 

This industrialized area is best known for its automotive industry, in particular the BMW South Africa factory, which opened in 1968, BMW's first factory outside Europe as well as the Nissan South Africa factory, manufacturing a vast range of motor vehicles, trucks, light delivery vans (LDV's, locally known as bakkies) and 4X4 offroaders and the IVECO too has a plant.

In 2012, vehicle manufacturing plants in South Africa contributed about 6.2% to the country's gross domestic product.

References

Populated places in the City of Tshwane